Lee Sang-Hong (born February 4, 1979) is a South Korean football player. He previous played for Bucheon SK, Jeju United, Gyeongnam FC, Chunnam Dragons and Busan I'Park.

He was arrested on the charge connected with the match fixing allegations on 7 July 2011.

References 

1979 births
Living people
South Korean footballers
K League 1 players
Jeju United FC players
Gyeongnam FC players
Jeonnam Dragons players
Busan IPark players
Yonsei University alumni
Association football defenders
Sportspeople from Busan